Joseph Francis Dronzek (born July 14, 1940 in Yonkers, New York) is an American sprint canoer who competed at the 1964 Summer Olympics in Tokyo,Japan. Canoeing at the 1964 Summer Olympics was held between 20 October and 22 October on Lake Sagami, 60 km (37 miles) from Sagamiko, Kanagawa, Japan. There were 7 events, 5 of which were for men and 2 for women. Unfortunately, he was eliminated in the semifinals of the C-2 1000 metres event. This is a picture of Mr. Dronzek is affiliated with the Yonkers Canoe Club, and trained for the world competition in New York's Hudson River and lake Osceola with his doubles partner James Jerome O'Rourke, Jr. During their training he was working full-time learning the electrical trade. Joe Dronzek became an electrician by trade and handyman for most that knew him; and even restored an old oak canoe with his daughter Christine years ago. At age 73, he still canoes mostly on Lake Oscawana in Putnam Valley, NY where he lives.

References
 Sports-reference.com profile
 
 
 

1940 births
Living people
American male canoeists
Canoeists at the 1964 Summer Olympics
Olympic canoeists of the United States